The Lost Hills are a low mountain range in the Transverse Ranges, near Lost Hills, California and Interstate 5 in western Kern County, California.

They contain the Lost Hills Oil Field, the largest oil field in Kern County, and are located in the southwestern San Joaquin Valley.

References 

Mountain ranges of Kern County, California
Transverse Ranges
Hills of California
Geography of the San Joaquin Valley
San Joaquin Valley
Mountain ranges of Southern California